Nikolai Baden Frederiksen (born 18 May 2000) is a Danish professional footballer who plays as a forward for Hungarian club Ferencváros, on loan from Vitesse.

Youth career
Baden started playing football at Næsby BK, and joined FC Nordsjælland in the summer 2015. At the age of 14, Baden was on a trial at Liverpool. He played a friendly game for their U16 squad against Wigan Athletic, which they won 2-1.

Club career

FC Nordsjælland
In the summer 2017, Baden signed a 3-year youth contract with the club and began training with the first team squad. He also went on a training camp with the team in the summer 2017 at the Netherlands.

Baden's first senior experience was on 30 July 2017, where he sat on the bench for the whole game against AaB. He got his debut for FC Nordsjælland on 14 October 2017 against Randers FC. Baden started on the bench, but replaced Viktor Tranberg in the 84th minute. Two minutes later, Baden scored the winning goal at the age of only 17 and FCN won the game 3-2.

Juventus
On 18 August 2018, it was announced that Baden had signed a four-year deal with Juventus. He started playing for the Primavera squad. Baden was bought for a price about 11,3 millioner danish krone.

Baden mainly played for Juventus' Primavera team in his first season. He got his debut for Juventus U23 in the Serie C in April 2019. After 9 appearances in Serie C, Baden was loaned out to Dutch club Fortuna Sittard on 31 January 2020 for the rest of the season. On 25 August, he was sent out on loan to Austrian club WSG Tirol for the 2020–21 season.

Vitesse
On 14 July 2021, he signed a three-year contract, with an additional extension option, with the Dutch club Vitesse. Baden scored in his first official game for the club against PEC Zwolle in the Eredivisie on 15 August 2021.

On transfer deadline day, 31 January 2023, Baden joined Hungarian club Ferencváros on a one-year loan deal - until 15 January 2024 - with an option to buy.

Ferencváros 
On 1 February 2023, he was signed by Nemzeti Bajnokság I club, Ferencváros.

References

External links
 
 Nikolai Baden Frederiksen at DBU

2000 births
Living people
Danish men's footballers
Danish expatriate men's footballers
Denmark youth international footballers
Association football midfielders
FC Nordsjælland players
Juventus F.C. players
Juventus Next Gen players
Fortuna Sittard players
WSG Tirol players
SBV Vitesse players
Ferencvárosi TC footballers
Danish Superliga players
Serie C players
Eredivisie players
Danish expatriate sportspeople in Italy
Danish expatriate sportspeople in the Netherlands
Danish expatriate sportspeople in Austria
Danish expatriate sportspeople in Hungary
Expatriate footballers in Italy
Expatriate footballers in the Netherlands
Expatriate footballers in Austria
Expatriate footballers in Hungary
Austrian Football Bundesliga players
Næsby Boldklub players
Footballers from Odense